Holger Vitus Nødskov Rune (born 29 April 2003) is a Danish professional tennis player. He was ranked as high as No. 8 in singles by the Association of Tennis Professionals (ATP), which he first achieved on 6 March 2023, making him the highest-ranked Danish singles male tennis player in the ATP rankings.

Rune has won three ATP Tour singles titles, including a Masters 1000 title at the 2022 Paris Masters, and produced his best Grand Slam performance at the 2022 French Open by reaching the quarterfinals in his main draw debut at the tournament. As a junior, Rune was ranked as high as world No. 1 and won ten titles on the ITF Junior Circuit, including the 2019 French Open boys' title. After turning professional in 2020, he won five titles on the ITF World Tennis Tour and five on the ATP Challenger Tour and made his top 100 debut in the 2022. Three months later, Rune reached his first ATP Tour final at the 2022 Bavarian International Tennis Championships, where he won his first title and subsequently entered into the top 50. By winning the Paris Masters later that year, Rune made his top 10 debut and became the first player on record (since ATP Rankings began in 1973) to beat five top-10 opponents in the same event (outside the ATP Finals).

Early life
Rune was born on 29 April 2003 in Gentofte, Denmark, to Aneke Rune and Anders Nødskov. He has a sister named Alma. He began playing tennis at the age of 6 because his sister played and he started to take the sport seriously. Throughout his childhood, he was coached by Lars Christensen who still remains his head coach and, along with his mother, is credited as his biggest inspiration. His idols growing up were fellow tennis players Rafael Nadal and Roger Federer.

Junior career
In 2014, he became Danish U12 champion in mixed doubles with Clara Tauson.

He started training at the Mouratoglou Academy in 2016.

In 2017, he won the European U14 singles championship.

At age 15, he became the youngest Danish male singles champion by winning the 2019 indoor tournament.

On 8 June 2019 Rune defeated Toby Alex Kodat to win the 2019 French Open boys' singles title.

Holger received a wildcard and won a match at the 2019 Blois ATP Challenger in June. At the time, he was 16 years, 1 month and 18 days old. Holger also competed in the 2019 Amersfoort Challenger in July where he captured his second ATP Challenger match win.

On 28 October 2019 he achieved a ITF juniors ranking of World No. 1 after he defeated Harold Mayot to win the ITF Junior Finals.

Rune served as a practice partner at the 2019 ATP Finals.

Professional career

2020: First ITF title, Top 500 debut
Rune officially turned pro in 2020 at the age of 16.

At the 2020 Auckland Open, Rune received a wildcard into the qualifying draw but lost to Vasek Pospisil in straight sets.

In July 2020, Holger became the youngest player to compete at the Ultimate Tennis Showdown (UTS), where he was defeated by French player Corentin Moutet.

In September 2020, Rune won his first ITF title at an M25 event in Switzerland. He would make three more ITF finals by the end of 2020, winning two of the three.

In October 2020, Rune received a wildcard to the ATP Challenger 80 in Puente Romano in Marbella, AnyTech365 Marbella Tennis Open. He lost 1-2 (6-1,4-6,4-6) in the first round to Elliot Benchetrit.

2021: ATP debut & first win, Four Challenger titles, top 110
Rune made three more ITF finals at the start of 2021, winning one.

In March 2021, Rune made his ATP debut as a wildcard in the Argentina Open. He lost in the first round to fifth seeded Albert Ramos Viñolas in three sets. At the Chile Open the next week, Rune was accepted into the qualifying draw as a wildcard. He went on to win the qualifying round and record his first ATP match win against Sebastián Báez in straight sets. He followed this up with his first top-30 victory over Benoît Paire in straight sets to reach his first ATP quarterfinal, where he lost to Federico Delbonis in straight sets. At the age of 17, he became the youngest ATP Tour quarterfinalist since 2014.

In June 2021, Rune won his first ATP Challenger title in Biella. His victory was overshadowed by homophobic slurs he made during his semi-final match. His actions were investigated by the ATP, and he was fined for his homophobic outburst.

In July 2021, Rune received another wave of wildcards into several clay-court events during the summer clay-court swing: the Swedish Open, Croatia Open, and Austrian Open Kitzbühel. He posted a few more match wins in these tournaments which boosted his ranking to a career-high of No. 145 on 23 August 2021 after winning the San Marino Open and the Verona Challenger, making him the second youngest male player in the top 150.

Rune entered the 2021 US Open Qualifying as the 24th seed. There, he won all three of his qualifying matches to qualify for the 2021 US Open for his grand slam debut. He played world No. 1 Novak Djokovic in the first round, where he lost the first set and won the second set in a tiebreak, but started to cramp late in the third set and eventually lost the match.

Rune made his second ATP quarterfinal at the Moselle Open, after qualifying for the main draw. He double-bageled lucky loser Bernabé Zapata Miralles in the first round, and then upset fifth seed Lorenzo Sonego in the second round in three sets to make the quarterfinals. He lost in the quarterfinals to second seed Pablo Carreño Busta in three sets.

On 4 November 2021, Rune qualified for the 2021 Next Generation ATP Finals. He finished the year ranked No. 103 in the ATP rankings.

2022: Three ATP Tour titles, first Grand Slam quarterfinal & Masters title, top 10 

Rune made his debut in the top 100 of the ATP singles rankings on 17 January 2022 at world No. 99, making him the second youngest male player after Carlos Alcaraz to be ranked in the top 100.  At the 2022 Open 13, he reached his first career ATP semifinal in the doubles tournament with partner Hugo Gaston, defeating top seeds Nicolas Mahut and Pierre-Hugues Herbert and Polish pair Szymon Walków and Jan Zieliński before losing to eventual champions Andrey Rublev and Denys Molchanov.

In April, Rune received a wild card to the Bavarian International Tennis Championships, where he defeated world No. 3 Alexander Zverev in the second round for his first top 10 win in his career in straight sets to advance to his third ATP quarterfinal. He then overcame Emil Ruusuvuori and Oscar Otte to reach his first career ATP singles final. There, his opponent, Botic van de Zandschulp, was forced to retire with chest pain with the scoreline at 3–4, leading the 70th-ranked Rune to become the tournament's third youngest champion in the Open Era after Guillermo Perez-Roldan in 1987. The title propelled Rune into the top 50 on 2 May 2022.

The following month, Rune made his main draw debut at the French Open, where he shocked 14th seed Denis Shapovalov in the first round before defeating Henri Laaksonen and Gaston in the second and third rounds, respectively, all in straight sets. He then stunned fourth seed Stefanos Tsitsipas to earn his third win of the season over a top 15 player to reach his first career Grand Slam quarterfinal, making him the first Danish man in singles to reach the quarterfinals of any Grand Slam tournament in the Open Era. There, he succumbed to Casper Ruud in four sets, but the achievement landed Rune inside the world's top 30.

Rune did not win a match between the French Open and Washington. In Washington, as the 9th seed, he beat Benoît Paire in the second round before losing to wildcard J.J. Wolf in the third round. In Montreal, Rune beat Fabio Fognini in straight sets in the first round, then lost to eventual champion Pablo Carreño Busta in the second round. In Cincinnati, Rune lost to 9th seed Cameron Norrie in the first round. At the US Open, Rune beat Peter Gojowczyk and received a walkover from John Isner to reach the third round, where he lost again to Norrie.

He reached his second ATP final in Sofia, beating Tim van Rijthoven, Lorenzo Sonego and Ilya Ivashka, then moved on to the final after defending champion and top seed Jannik Sinner retired in the middle of their match due to injury. He lost to Marc-Andrea Hüsler in the final. As a result he qualified for the 2022 Next Generation ATP Finals in Milan on 30 September.

He reached his third final at the 2022 Stockholm Open by defeating fifth seed Alex de Minaur. As a result he reached the top 25 in the rankings on 24 October 2022. He won his second title defeating top seed Stefanos Tsitsipas in the final. The following week at the next tournament in Basel he beat again seventh seeded Alex de Minaur in the first round. He reached the final defeating two Frenchmen Ugo Humbert and Arthur Rinderknech, and then sixth seed Roberto Bautista Agut in the semifinals. As a result he made his top 20 debut in the rankings at No. 18 on 31 October 2022. He became only the fourth man born in the 2000s to reach the Top 20 in the ATP rankings.

He saved three match points in his opening match against Wawrinka on his debut at the 2022 Rolex Paris Masters. He then defeated four top-10 players in a row: 10th seed Hubert Hurkacz, world No. 9 and 7th seed Andrey Rublev, World No. 1 Carlos Alcaraz, and world No. 8 Félix Auger-Aliassime, to reach his first Masters 1000 and fourth final in a row. It was his 18th tour-level win in 20 matches. He defeated 6th seed and world No. 7 defending champion Novak Djokovic, his fifth top-10 win in a row, to win his first Masters 1000 title, the youngest champion in Paris since Boris Becker in 1986. He became the first man to beat five top-10 opponents in the same event (excluding the ATP Finals). As a result he moved into the top 10 in the rankings on 7 November 2022. He also moved one position up as first alternate for the 2022 ATP Finals. The same day on 6 November, he withdrew from the 2022 Next Generation ATP Finals.

2023: World No. 8
Following his semifinal showing at the Mexican Open, he moved up two spots in the singles rankings to world No. 8 on 6 March 2023.

Singles performance timeline

Current through the 2023 Davis Cup World Group I Play-offs.

Significant finals

Masters 1000 finals

Singles: 1

ATP career finals

Singles: 5 (3 titles, 2 runner-ups)

ATP Challenger and ITF World Tennis Tour finals

Singles: 13 (9–4)

Doubles: 2 (1–1)

Junior Grand Slam Finals

Singles: 1 (1 title)

Record against other players
Rune's record against players who have been ranked in the top 10, with those who are active in boldface. Only ATP Tour main draw matches are considered:

Wins over top 10 Players
Rune has a  record against players who were, at the time the match was played, ranked in the top 10.

See also
List of Denmark Davis Cup team representatives

Notes

References

External links 

 
 
 

2003 births
Living people
Danish male tennis players
French Open junior champions
Grand Slam (tennis) champions in boys' singles
21st-century Danish people